The Cobb Marathon Bowl was a greyhound racing competition held at Catford Stadium.

It was a leading competition run over the longer marathon race distance and was inaugurated in 1942 over 810 yards.

The event was introduced by a Catford greyhound owner called Mr Francis Rupert Victor Cobb (a brewer by trade). He died in 1966 which led to the race also being known as a memorial race.

The race was discontinued in 1975 because other marathon events such as the TV Trophy surpassed it in regard to importance.

Past winners

Venues & Distances 
1942-1971 (Catford 810y)
1972-1974 (Catford 790y)
1975-1975 (Catford 790m)
Discontinued

References

External links
British Greyhound Racing Board

Greyhound racing competitions in the United Kingdom
Recurring sporting events established in 1942
Sport in the London Borough of Lewisham
Greyhound racing in London